The Central Directorate of Public Security (DCSP) is the uniformed patrol and response arm of the French National Police (Police Nationale) responsible for keeping the peace and maintaining public order in the cities and large towns of France. Established on 23 April 1941, and its current structure operates under the Decree of 23 December 1993Aleksander Olech, French and Polish fight against terrorism, Poznan 2022, p. 90; https://www.researchgate.net/publication/359135918_French_and_Polish_fight_against_terrorism.

The DCSP consists of over 78,000 mainly uniformed police personnel known as Gardiens de la Paix ("Guardians of the Peace") deployed in 102 Départemental directorates with 462 Urban Offices. They provide general police services, including crime prevention, patrol, and response to calls for assistance. It maintains a small plainclothes corps who investigates local crimes; these are organised into Criminal Brigades.

The DCSP also deploys 9 Groupes d'Intervention de la Police Nationale (GIPN), intervention units similar to the Recherche Assistance Intervention Dissuasion (RAID) team (which is directly under orders of the Direction Générale de la Police Nationale).

There are also dog units, boat units, and an air wing.

See also
Police in France
Department of Public Safety

External links 
 French ministry of the Interior

National Police (France)